Reggie Diergaardt (born September 9, 1957 in Upington, Northern Cape) is a Namibian politician and former member of the National Assembly of Namibia.

Prior to Namibian independence in 1990, Diergaardt was the leader of the Labour Party and one of the founding members of the United Democratic Front. He served in the Constituent Assembly of Namibia on a UDF ticket from 1990 to 1995.

References

1957 births
Living people
Coloured Namibian people
People from Upington
United Democratic Front (Namibia) politicians
Namibian people of South African descent
Members of the National Assembly (Namibia)